Louis Ide (born 3 July 1973, in Roeselare) is a Belgian physician and politician affiliated to the N-VA.

Career 
Ide was Vice President of N-VA from 2004 until 2007. In 2007, he was elected as a member of the Belgian Senate. He was Vice President of the Senate from 2013 until 2014.

Ide was elected member of the European Parliament in the 2014 elections. However, upon being elected General Secretary of N-VA on 13 December 2014, he resigned his seat.

References

1973 births
Living people
Members of the Senate (Belgium)
New Flemish Alliance politicians
MEPs for Belgium 2014–2019